"Mad World" is a 1982 song by British band Tears for Fears. Written by Roland Orzabal and sung by bassist Curt Smith, it was the band's third single release and first chart hit, reaching number three on the UK Singles Chart in November 1982. Both "Mad World" and its B-side, "Ideas as Opiates", appeared on the band's debut LP The Hurting (1983). This single was also the band's first international success, reaching the Top 40 in several countries in 1982–83.

"Mad World" has since been covered by various artists, including a 2001 version recorded by Michael Andrews and Gary Jules for the soundtrack of the film Donnie Darko; a 2003 single release of the song reached number one in the UK for three consecutive weeks and won Orzabal his second Ivor Novello Award. A 2021 rendition of the song was included on Demi Lovato's album Dancing with the Devil... the Art of Starting Over.

The cover photo was taken at Round Pond in Kensington Gardens (London, England).

Background
"Mad World" was originally written on acoustic guitar when Orzabal was 19 after being inspired to write a new wave song in the vein of Duran Duran's "Girls on Film". After a few false starts with Orzabal on vocals, he suggested Smith sing it and "suddenly it sounded fabulous".

"Mad World" was intended to be the B-side for the band's second single "Pale Shelter (You Don't Give Me Love)", but their record company stated that "Mad World" could be a single in its own right. The band then opted to re-record "Mad World" with producers Ross Cullum and Chris Hughes, the latter a former drummer with Adam and the Ants.

Curt Smith's ad lib in the song's final chorus resulted in a mondegreen. Smith clarified the actual lyric in 2010:

Meaning
The song was influenced by the theories of Arthur Janov, author of The Primal Scream. The lyric "the dreams in which I'm dying are the best I've ever had" suggests that dreams of intense experiences such as death will be the best at releasing tension.

Reception
Cash Box said that the song "grows on you, expanding from a soft dance tune to a shy Britisher's confessions of his darkest dreams."

B-side
"Ideas as Opiates" is a song that originally served as the B-side to the "Mad World" single. This earlier version was produced by the band themselves, though it was later re-recorded for inclusion on The Hurting. The song takes its name from a chapter title in Arthur Janov's book Prisoners of Pain and features lyrics related to the concept of primal therapy. The song is musically sparse, featuring just a piano, drum machine, and saxophone. An alternative version of this song titled "Saxophones as Opiates" was included as a B-side on the 12-inch single and is mostly instrumental.

Music video
The promotional video for "Mad World" was filmed in late summer 1982, in the grounds of Knebworth House. It was Tears for Fears' first music video, and features Curt Smith staring out of a window while Roland Orzabal dances outside on a lakeside jetty. A brief party scene in the video features friends and family of the band, including Smith's mother as well as his then-wife Lynne.

According to Curt Smith, "When we made the video in a country estate on the cheap, we bussed all our friends and family up from Bath and had a fun day. The woman who's having the birthday party in the video is my mum."

The music video was directed by Clive Richardson who was notable for his work at that time with Depeche Mode.

Track listings
7-inch: Mercury / IDEA3 (United Kingdom) / 812 213–7 (United States)
 "Mad World" – 3:32
 "Ideas as Opiates" – 3:54

7-inch: Mercury / IDEA3 (Ireland) / 6059 568 (Australia, Europe) / TOS 1411 (South Africa)
 "Mad World" (World Remix) – 3:42
 "Ideas as Opiates" – 3:54

7-inch double pack: Mercury / IDEA33 (United Kingdom)
 "Mad World" – 3:32
 "Mad World" (World Remix) – 3:42
 "Suffer the Children" (Remix) – 4:15
 "Ideas as Opiates" – 3:54

12-inch: Mercury / IDEA312 (United Kingdom) / 6400 677 (Europe)
 "Mad World" – 3:32
 "Ideas as Opiates" – 3:54
 "Saxophones as Opiates" – 3:54

Charts

Weekly charts

Year-end charts

Certifications

Michael Andrews and Gary Jules version

"Mad World" achieved a second round of success 20 years after its release, when it was covered by Michael Andrews and Gary Jules for the film Donnie Darko (2001). While the Tears for Fears version featured synthesisers and heavy percussion, the Andrews/Jules version was stripped down; instead of a full musical backing, it used only a set of piano chords, a mellotron imitating a cello, very light touches of electric piano, and modest use of a vocoder on the chorus.

Their version was originally released on CD in 2002 on the film's soundtrack, but an increasing cult-following spawned by the film's DVD release finally prompted Jules and Andrews to issue the song as a proper single. It was released through Sanctuary Records on 15 December 2003, in time for the race for the UK's Christmas number one, beating "Christmas Time (Don't Let the Bells End)" by the Darkness to take the title the following week.

This version was used in 2005 as the soundtrack for the opening section of the Season 6 episode "Room Service" of CSI: Crime Scene Investigation.

Background
For the soundtrack to the film Donnie Darko (2001), director Richard Kelly commissioned Michael Andrews, a San Diego musician and television and film composer who had worked as a member of a range of bands, including the Origin with Gary Jules (whose two solo albums he had produced), and the Greyboy Allstars. Kelly said he was confident that Andrews could do the job: "I met with Michael and I just knew right away that he was really, really talented and that he could come up with a really original score. He would allow me to be in there and be really kind of editorial with how I wanted the score to be." Andrews relocated to Los Angeles to work on the film between October and December 2000. As Andrews states, the low budget for the project encouraged him to play a diverse range of instruments for the soundtrack:
The film was pretty low budget so my portion of the money was pretty thin. I couldn't hire anyone, it was just me. I played everything; piano, mellotron, mini marimba, xylophone, ukulele, organ. I also brought in two female vocalists Sam Shelton and Tori Haberman. But no guitar because Richard said no guitar or drums; he just wasn't into it. I was down with that—I've played guitar my whole life.

Like many of his role models for soundtrack composing (such as John Barry and Ennio Morricone), Andrews wanted to put a song on his otherwise instrumental score. He eventually chose "Mad World", as Tears for Fears were one of his and childhood friend Jules' favourite bands growing up. Andrews enlisted Jules to sing the song, while Andrews himself played the piano; together they recorded the song in an hour and a half.

Despite being critically acclaimed, Donnie Darko was not a commercial success, but it sold very well on DVD and became a cult film, and demand grew for Andrews and Jules' cover of "Mad World" to be released as a proper single. This prompted Andrews to give the song an official release.

Jules said that he believed the song was easy for people to relate to: "I think it's a really beautiful example of a person struggling with the fact that life is mad. I honestly think it's one of the most beautiful songs I have ever heard and the way it's stripped down now just pins people." He went on to say, "Every so often a song with just vocals, piano and cello creeps up on you and says something about who you are, where you're going which stops you in your tracks."

Chart performance
Despite "Christmas Time (Don't Let the Bells End)" by the Darkness being the bookmakers' favourite to become the 2003 Christmas number one in the UK, "Mad World" upset the odds and took the title on 21 December 2003. It remained at number one on the UK Singles Chart for three consecutive weeks. The song's success in the UK did not, however, translate to the United States, where it reached number 30 on the Billboard Modern Rock Tracks chart in the issue dated 27 March 2004.

Jules performed "Mad World" with Mylène Farmer on her Timeless 2013 Tour. In 2006, the song was included in the commercial to the video game Gears of War, which helped move it up the charts. A performance on the eighth season of American Idol by Adam Lambert also briefly increased its sales and interest in the song. The song reached No. 11 on the Rock Digital Songs chart.

The song charted again in Australia in 2020 following the success of The Masked Singer.

Music video
The music video was directed by Michel Gondry and was filmed at Hoboken Middle School (formally AJ Demarest School) in Hoboken, New Jersey in 2004. It begins with an aerial shot of the school; the bell rings and children go out onto the pavement. The rest of the video sees the children forming different shapes whilst Jules stands on the roof and watches from above. On two occasions the camera pans towards Jules looking down at the children, whilst a third pan away sees Andrews playing a piano as the song ends. The video has over 167 million views since it was uploaded to YouTube on 9 January 2006.

Curt Smith paid tribute to the Jules and Andrews version in April 2020 while staying home under general quarantine orders due to the COVID-19 pandemic. He and his daughter Diva performed an acoustic guitar rendition of "Mad World" using the style of Jules and Andrews, uploading the video to YouTube. Their version went viral, picking up more than a million views in one week, and four million views in the first month.

Track listings
CD1: Sanctuary / SANXD250 (United Kingdom)
 "Mad World" – 3:06
 "No Poetry" – 3:59
 "Mad World" (alternate version) – 3:37

CD2: Sanctuary / SANXD250X (United Kingdom)
 "Mad World" (Grayed Out Mix) – 6:45
 "The Artifact & Living" – 2:26
 "Mad World" (video) – 3:20

Charts and certifications

Weekly charts

Year-end charts

Decade-end charts

Certifications

Release history

References

External links
 Boston Globe article on the Andrews/Jules cover 

Songs about depression
1982 singles
1982 songs
2003 debut singles
Christmas number-one singles in the United Kingdom
Mercury Records singles
Music videos directed by Michel Gondry
Number-one singles in Scotland
Phonogram Records singles
Song recordings produced by Ross Cullum
Song recordings produced by Chris Hughes (record producer)
Songs written by Roland Orzabal
Tears for Fears songs
UK Independent Singles Chart number-one singles
UK Singles Chart number-one singles
Internet memes introduced in 2003